Diaphus is a genus of lanternfishes. It is the most species-rich lanternfish genus.

Species
There are 77 recognized species:

References

Myctophidae
Extant Eocene first appearances
Marine fish genera
Taxa named by Carl H. Eigenmann
Taxa named by Rosa Smith Eigenmann
Species described in 1890